Chen Zijiang (born October 1959) is a Chinese reproductive medicine expert currently serving as vice-president of Shandong University and dean of the Cheeloo College of Medicine, Shandong University.

Biography
Chen was born in Liuyang, Hunan in October 1959. After the high school, she studied, then taught, at what is now the Cheeloo College of Medicine, Shandong University. In May 2013 she was promoted to become vice-president of Shandong University. She concurrently serves as dean of the Cheeloo College of Medicine, Shandong University since July 2015. In December 2017 she was elected a member of the Standing Committee of the Chinese Peasants' and Workers' Democratic Party.

She was a member of the 10th, 11th and 12th National Committee of the Chinese People's Political Consultative Conference.

Honours and awards
 November 2019 Academician of the Chinese Academy of Sciences (CAS)

References

1959 births
Living people
People from Liuyang
Scientists from Hunan
Shandong University alumni
Academic staff of Shandong University
Members of the Chinese Academy of Sciences
Members of the 10th Chinese People's Political Consultative Conference
Members of the 11th Chinese People's Political Consultative Conference
Members of the 12th Chinese People's Political Consultative Conference
Chinese women physicians